Eric Radomski is a producer best known as a co-creator of Batman: The Animated Series (as well as the co-director of the series'  theatrical film Batman: Mask of the Phantasm). He has also acted as producer for Spawn: The Animated Series, Freakazoid!, Xiaolin Showdown, Shaggy & Scooby-Doo Get a Clue!, Ultimate Spider-Man, Avengers Assemble, Hulk and the Agents of S.M.A.S.H. and Guardians of the Galaxy.

Career
Eric Radomski's career took off in the 1990s at Warner Bros. Animation with Batman: The Animated Series, with Radomski responsible for the show's iconic art style. After his contract with WBA expired, he joined HBO's Spawn. However, he returned to WBA for Xiaolin Showdown and Shaggy and Scooby-Doo Get a Clue!.

On March 7, 2008, Throwback Entertainment appointed Eric Radomski as its Chief Creative Officer

In 2010, he joined Marvel Animation as senior vice president, a role he's held ever since.

References

External links

American television producers
American people of Polish descent
Living people
Year of birth missing (living people)